Stenella anthuriicola is a species of anamorph fungus in the family Mycosphaerellaceae. It grows on the leaves of Anthurium plants in Thailand.

References

External links 

anthuriicola
Fungi described in 2006
Fungi of Asia
Fungal plant pathogens and diseases
 Ornamental plant pathogens and diseases